Emilie Schwindt was a Belgian fencer. She competed in the women's individual foil event at the 1948 Summer Olympics.

References

External links
 

Year of birth missing
Possibly living people
Belgian female foil fencers
Olympic fencers of Belgium
Fencers at the 1948 Summer Olympics